Schillersdorf is a commune in the Bas-Rhin department in Grand Est in north-eastern France.

History

1208: First mention of "Schiltolfesdorf"......
1358: Becomes schillersdorf which veient Schilter, which means village on a hill......
1400: Construction of the Tower the Bell Tower of fortified ' Church whose base is ours......
1405: The Emperor Ruprecht confirms Schillersdorf as stronghold of imperial aus Lichtenberg.......
1554: Johann Volk, first pastor, the Protestant parish (introduction of the reform Protestant in County of Hanau-Lichtenberg.) .....
1631: The village has 61 subjects due to various conflicts, the paste and the famine......
1686: Seal of the Schillersdorf community, representing Saint-Martin...... 
1720: The population of the town is 200 people...... 
1725: First terrier, the first cadastre reported 53 houses.....
1759: First clover crop for rotation in Alsace, an initiative deu Pastor Christian Schroeder - promotes agricultural experiments.....
1831: cadastre of the municipality.....
1851-1854: Construction of the new church with the Bell Tower conservation gold choir and the current Town Hall, primary school, at 20 rue Pasteur Schroeder.....

See also
 Communes of the Bas-Rhin department

References

External links

Communes of Bas-Rhin